Ericodesma argentosa is a species of moth of the family Tortricidae. It is found in New Zealand.

The wingspan is 16–17 mm for both males and females. The forewings are silvery white, but the edge of the costa is blackish. The hindwings are pale greyish white.

References

Moths described in 1924
Archipini
Moths of New Zealand